Johan Enrique Montes Quintero (born 4 January 2000) is a Venezuelan professional footballer who plays as a defender for Spanish club Mérida AD.

References

External links

2000 births
Living people
Sportspeople from Maracay
Venezuelan footballers
Association football defenders
Venezuelan Primera División players
Aragua FC players
Monagas S.C. players
Divisiones Regionales de Fútbol players
Mérida AD players
Venezuelan expatriate footballers
Venezuelan expatriate sportspeople in Spain
Expatriate footballers in Spain